Wapnica  (formerly ) is a village in the administrative district of Gmina Międzyzdroje, within Kamień County, West Pomeranian Voivodeship, in north-western Poland.

The village has a population of 350.

See also
History of Pomerania

References

Villages in Kamień County